Wells Fargo Plaza may refer to:

Wells Fargo Plaza (Billings), Montana
Wells Fargo Plaza (Bloomington), Minnesota
Wells Fargo Plaza (El Paso), Texas
Wells Fargo Plaza (Houston), Texas
Wells Fargo Plaza (Phoenix), Arizona
Wells Fargo Plaza (San Diego), California
Wells Fargo Plaza (Tacoma), Washington

See also
Wells Fargo Building (disambiguation)
Wells Fargo Center (disambiguation)
Wells Fargo Tower (disambiguation)